Víctor Díaz Suárez (born 29 March 1991), commonly known as Viti, is a Spanish professional footballer who plays for UCAM Murcia CF. Mainly a left winger, he can also play as a left back.

Club career
Díaz was born in León, and finished his formation with hometown club Cultural y Deportiva Leonesa. He made his senior debut with the farm team during the 2007–08 season, in Tercera División.

Díaz made his first team debut on 11 May 2008 at the age of just 17, starting in a 0–1 Segunda División B home loss against SD Lemona. However, he would only feature regularly for the B-side in the following campaigns.

On 20 July 2011 Díaz joined another reserve team, Deportivo de La Coruña B in the fourth division. On 30 July 2013 he returned to Cultu, after scoring a career-best nine goals during the 2012–13 season.

On 6 June 2016, Díaz signed a new two-year deal, running until 2018. He contributed with 29 appearances (play-offs included) and three goals as his side achieved promotion to Segunda División after a 42-year absence.

Díaz made his professional debut on 18 August 2017, starting in a 0–2 away loss against Lorca FC.

Honours
Cultural Leonesa
Segunda División B: 2016–17

References

External links

1991 births
Living people
Sportspeople from León, Spain
Spanish footballers
Footballers from Castile and León
Association football wingers
Segunda División players
Segunda División B players
Tercera División players
Cultural Leonesa footballers
Deportivo Fabril players
UCAM Murcia CF players